PragmataPro is a monospaced font family designed for programming, created by Fabrizio Schiavi. It is a narrow programming font designed for legibility. The font implements Unicode characters, including (polytonic) Greek, Cyrillic, Arabic, Hebrew and the APL codepoints. The font specifically implements ligatures for programming, such as multiple-character operators. The characters are hinted by hand.

PragmataPro was designed to have contained line-spacing and offer rasterization for screens of most sizes except the most small.
Notable features also include math and phonetics support.

Unicode coverage 
It includes 7,414 glyphs (6,148 Characters) in version 0.824 (2016) from the following Unicode blocks:

 Basic Latin (95)
 Latin-1 Supplement (96)
 Latin Extended-A (128)
 Latin Extended-B (183)
 IPA Extensions (96)
 Spacing Modifier Letters (80)
 Combining Diacritical Marks (106)
 Greek (83)
 Cyrillic (98)
 Hebrew (87)
 Arabic (194)
 Runic (1)
 Phonetic Extensions (128)
 Latin Extended Additional (256)
 Greek Extended (233)
 General Punctuation (112)
 Superscripts and Subscripts (42)
 Currency Symbols (4)
 Letterlike Symbols (80)
 Number Forms (60)
 Arrows (112)
 Mathematical Operators (256)
 Miscellaneous Technical (174)
 Control Pictures (39)
 Box Drawing (128)
 Block Elements (32)
 Geometric Shapes (96)
 Miscellaneous Symbols (174)
 Dingbats (158)
 Miscellaneous Mathematical Symbols-A (44)
 Supplemental Arrows-A (16)
 Braille Patterns (256)
 Supplemental Arrows-B (128)
 Miscellaneous Mathematical Symbols-B (128)
 Supplemental Mathematical Operators (256)
 Miscellaneous Symbols and Arrows (206)
 Latin Extended-C (3)
 Supplemental Punctuation (1)
 Bopomofo (37)
 Private Use Area (1,266)
 Alphabetic Presentation Forms (48)
 Arabic Presentation Forms (151)
 Small Form Variants (26)
 Arabic Presentation Forms-B (141)
 Halfwidth and Fullwidth Forms (99)
 Mathematical Alphanumeric Symbols (1,020)
 Playing Cards (59)
 Miscellaneous Symbols and Pictograms (26)
 Supplemental Arrows-C (146)

Usage examples

See also 
Iosevka, a Monospaced font with a design similar to PragmataPro

References

External links 

 fileformat.info/info/unicode/font/pragmatapro
 Article appeared on Medium about PragmataPro development
 Attempt to transform it as open source typeface

Monospaced typefaces
Grotesque sans-serif typefaces
Typefaces and fonts introduced in 2010